Rank comparison chart of navies of North and South American states.

Enlisted

See also
Comparative navy officer ranks of Asia
Comparative navy officer ranks of Europe
Ranks and insignia of NATO navies officers

References

Americas
Military comparisons